The 2022 División Intermedia season, named "Homenaje al Doctor Luis Lezcano Pastore y al Escribano Julio César Ortiz Duarte", was the 104th season of the second-tier league of Paraguayan football and 25th under the Paraguayan División Intermedia name. The season began on 1 April and ended on 11 October 2022. The fixtures for the season were announced on 15 December 2021.

Sportivo Trinidense and Sportivo Luqueño ensured their promotion to the Paraguayan Primera División with two matches in hand; the former by drawing 1–1 with 2 de Mayo at home on 25 September 2022, while the latter clinched promotion with a 1–0 victory against Atlético Colegiales coupled with a 2–0 loss for Pastoreo against Fernando de la Mora the following day. Sportivo Trinidense ended up clinching the tournament's title the following weekend, with a win over Atlético Colegiales and a loss for Sportivo Luqueño against San Lorenzo.

Format
16 teams took part in the competition, which was played under a double round-robin system with teams playing each other twice, once at home and once away for a total of 30 matches. The top two teams at the end of the season were promoted to the Paraguayan Primera División for the 2023 season, while the bottom three teams in the relegation table at the end of the season were relegated: teams located within 50 kilometres of Asunción were relegated to Primera División B, while teams from outside Greater Asunción and the Central Department were relegated to Primera División B Nacional.

Teams
16 teams competed in the season: 11 teams from the previous División Intermedia season plus the two teams relegated from Primera División in its 2021 season (River Plate and Sportivo Luqueño), the top two teams from the 2021 Primera División B (Atlético Colegiales and Martín Ledesma) and the 2019–20 Campeonato Nacional de Interligas champions Pastoreo.

Stadia and locations

Standings

Results

Top scorers

Source: APF

Relegation
Relegation was determined at the end of the season by computing an average of the number of points earned per game over the past three seasons. The three teams with the lowest average were relegated to Primera División B or Primera División B Nacional for the following season, depending on their geographical location.

 Source: APF

See also
2022 Paraguayan Primera División season
2022 Copa Paraguay

References

External links
División Intermedia on the APF's website

Paraguayan División Intermedia
Par
I